The Moderates of Åland (previously Freeminded Co-operation) was a liberal-conservative political party on the Åland Islands. At the 2003 elections, the party won 13.6% of popular votes and 4 out of 30 seats. The current party leader is Johan Ehn.  In the 21 October 2007 parliamentary elections, the party won 9.5% of the popular vote and 3 out of 30 seats, a loss of one.

See also
 Lemland List

References

External links

Defunct political parties in Åland
Liberal conservative parties
Conservative parties in Finland